Melvin Henley (born August 25, 1935) is an American politician who served in the Kentucky House of Representatives from the 5th district from 2005 to 2013.  He is a graduate of Murray State University where he received a Bachelor of Science degree in chemistry.

References

1935 births
Living people
Members of the Kentucky House of Representatives
Kentucky Republicans
Kentucky Democrats